Gowkaran Roopnarine (born 24 February 1982) is a Guyana born American cricketer. A left-handed batsman and wicket-keeper, he has played for the United States national cricket team since 2005, including four List A matches.

Biography

Born in Guyana in 1982, Gowkaran Roopnarine first played for the US in the 2005 ICC Trophy. After playing in a warm-up match against Namibia, he played four matches in the tournament proper, scoring 98 in the ninth place play-off against Oman, his highest List A score.

He played in the following years ICC Americas Championship in Ontario, and most recently represented his country in Division Five of the World Cricket League in Jersey.

References

1982 births
Living people
American cricketers
Wicket-keepers